Caldas Novas is a Brazilian municipality in the state of Goiás. It is considered by many to be the largest hydro-thermal resort in the world.

Location
Caldas Novas is located 170 km south of state capital, Goiânia, with good roads linking to that city.  It belongs to the Meia Ponte Microregion, which has 338,147 inhabitants (2007) in 21 cities and a total area of 21,229.00 km2.
Highway connections are made by BR-352 / Bela Vista de Goiás / GO-147 / Piracanjuba / GO-217 / GO-139 / GO-213. See Sepin for a complete list of all distances in Goiás
 
Neighboring municipalities are:
North: Santa Cruz de Goiás and Piracanjuba
South: Corumbaíba
East: Ipameri
West: Rio Quente and Morrinhos

The city and region are served by Nelson Ribeiro Guimarães Airport.

Demographics
Population density in 2007: 39.13 inhabitants/km2 
Population growth rate 1996/2007: 4.18.%
Total population in 2007: 62,204
Total population in 1980: 11,274
Urban population in 2007: 55,376
Rural population in 2007: 2,140
Population change: the population has grown from 11,000 in 1980.

Politics
Eligible voters in 2007: 43,274
City government in 2005: mayor (Magda Mofatto Hon), vice-mayor (Silvânia Fernandes e Silva), and 10 councilmembers.  
Besides the municipal seat there are the "povoados" (villages) of Nossa Senhora de Fátima and Vila de Furnas; and the "aglomerados" (hamlets) of Junqueilândia, Paraíso and Sapé.

History
In 1777 Martinho Coelho and Gustavo- Mauricio Silva De Carvalho Alves discovered the hot water springs that became known as Caldas de Piratinga, later changing the name to Caldas, on the banks of the Caldas River.  The discover registered the land and established a ranch on the left bank of the river, which he named "Fazenda das Caldas".  Gold was found in small quantities attracting prospectors and others in search of cures in the hot waters.  In 1850 another settlement arose on the right bank of the river near the hot springs, where a church was soon built.  In 1857 Caldas Novas became a district and in 1911 it became a municipality.

Economy
The main source of income of the municipality is tourism.  Caldas Novas is known throughout Brazil as one of the largest hydrothermal resorts in the world so in the high season the city receives as many as 100,000 tourists and at carnival as many as 300,000 people.  Almost two thousand people are employed in this sector.  The infrastructure of the city has more than 80 hotels and pensions (12,000 beds), (many with heated swimming pools and all with hot water produced by the natural thermal system), chalets, clubs, nightclubs, bars and restaurants.  (All data are from Sepin/IBGE)

Economic Data (2007)
Industrial establishments: 144
Financial Institutions in 2007: Banco do Brasil S.A. - Bradesco S.A. - Banco Itaú S.A. - CEF - HSBC Bank Brasil S.A. -Banco Multiplo
Dairies: Laticínios Serina Ltda.; - Coop. M. dos Prod. de Leite de Morrinhos Ltda.
Retail establishments in 2007: 1,282
Industrial district:  Distrito Agroindustrial de Caldas Novas (June/2006)
Automobiles: 10,500 (2007)

Main agricultural products in ha.(2006)
cotton:      120 
rice:        600  
banana:       20 
coconut:      20 
oranges:     220
lemon:        15
corn:      3,600
soybeans: 15,600
sorghum:   1,200

Farm Data (2006)in ha.
Number of farms:                551
Total area:                  79,324 
Area of permanent crops:        114
Area of perennial crops:     17,634
Area of natural pasture:     40,770 
Persons dependent on farming: 1,100
Farms with tractors:            136
Number of tractors:             211 IBGE

Health and education
Health clinics: 14 (2007)
Hospitals: 04 (03 private)
Hospital beds: 131
Infant mortality in 2000: 21.55
Schools:      52
Students: 18,765
Higher education: (2006) Faculdade de Caldas Novas,  Faculdade Sete de Setembro FSS, and Unidade Universitária da UEG.   
Literacy rate in 2000: 92.5

High quality of life
Caldas Novas is one of the best places to live in the state of Goiás.  In the United Nations Human Development Index Caldas Novas had a rating of 0.802,which ranked it 10 out of a total of 242 municipalities in the state of Goiás.  Nationally it was ranked 533  out of 5,507 municipalities.  For the complete list see Frigoletto

Information about the hot water of Caldas Novas
In Caldas Novas there are 86 active wells, pumping an average of 1,200 m³ an hour, in a period of 14 daily hours.  The temperature of the water varies between 34 and 57 °C.

The first references to the hot water of this region were published in Spain in 1545.   In 1722, Bartolomeu Bueno da Silva, son of the famous bandeirante, Anhangüera, turning off the trail blazed by his father years before, discovered the thermal springs that form the Rio Quente.  These were called Caldas Velhas and were located in the place where the Rio Quente Resorts is now located.

The most important study about the thermal ism of Caldas Novas and the Rio Quente was carried out by the state enterprise Furnas Centrais Elétricas, due to the possible influence of the Usina Hidrelétrica Corumbá I dam on the thermal water table of the region, which would be under the risk of cooling.  According to Furnas, the phenomenon of the hot water is produced by peculiar geological and topographic characteristics.  For years it was thought that a volcano had existed in the area in whose crater rainwater infiltrated, heating at great depths and then returning to the surface by way of cracks in the rock. More modern studies show that there is no indication of volcanic activity in the region, this theory reinforced by the elliptical form of the Serra de Caldas shown in a satellite photo 
Studies show that the water is formed by rainfall that is stored in a layer of quartzite and due to pressure is sent to the surface in a column 600 meters. See Rio Quente.com

The suspicion that the cold water of the reservoir of Usina Corumbá I could infiltrate the thermal watertable of Caldas Novas and Rio Quente has no basis, since the waters of the lake are at an elevation of 595 meters, well below the source of the water, at 644 meters.

The municipality contains part of the  Caldas Novas State Park which protects the Serra de Caldas plateau region that is the main source of water for the geothermal aquifers of the region.
Another great attraction of Caldas Novas is Ecotourism, since the city is located near the Corumbá River and the Caldas Novas State Park. In the surrounding area there is a lake - Lago de Piratininga - with boiling water; a reservoir called Lago de Corumbá with 64 square kilometers damming the Corumbá; and another river - the Rio Quente - which has natural warm water.

Rio Quente
One of the largest hotwater resort complexes in the world - Rio Quente Resorts - is located 20 kilometers to the west of Caldas in the municipality of Rio Quente. With seven hotels, a convention center, and 500 square kilometres of space it receives more than 1 million tourists a year.

See also
List of municipalities in Goiás

References

BrasilEscola (in Portuguese)
Frigoletto

External links

City Hall of Caldas Novas website
Caldas Novas Tur

Municipalities in Goiás